Ahsham-e Ahmad (also Romanized as Aḩshām-e Aḩmad and Aḩshām Aḩmad; also known as Aḩshām-e Aḩmadī, Khashm Ajhmadi, and Khashm-e-Ahmadī) is a village in Rudhaleh Rural District, Rig District, Ganaveh County, Bushehr Province, Iran. At the 2006 census, its population was 45, in 7 families.

References 

Populated places in Ganaveh County